Moussa Yedan (born 20 July 1989) is a Burkinabé footballer who currently plays for Majestic FC. Yedan played for Egyptian Premier League side Al-Ahly as well as Burkina Faso national football team.

Former star player of Étoile Filante, the Burkinabé joined Coton Sport ahead of the 2013 season, breaking into the first team after the half-way break. Moussa Yedan played for the various youth teams of Burkina Faso and was approached by Romanian and Belgium clubs before making his move to Garoua. The left winger competed in the 2013 CAF Champions League,  securing a regular starting spot in the squad, before losing in the semi-finals to the title holders Al-Ahly of Egypt. After the competition, he made a move to Al-Ahly. Yedan signed a contract for 3 years and half starting from January 2014.

Yedan made his debut with Burkina Faso in 2012. In November 2013, he was called up for the 2014 World Cup qualification match against Algeria on November 19, 2013.

References

External links 

Moussa Yedan at Footballdatabase

1989 births
Living people
Burkinabé footballers
Burkinabé expatriate footballers
Burkina Faso international footballers
People from Bobo-Dioulasso
2015 Africa Cup of Nations players
Étoile Filante de Ouagadougou players
Coton Sport FC de Garoua players
Al Ahly SC players
Al-Orobah FC players
Haras El Hodoud SC players
AS Tanda players
AS Otôho players
Saudi Professional League players
Egyptian Premier League players
Association football midfielders
Burkinabé expatriate sportspeople in Cameroon
Burkinabé expatriate sportspeople in Egypt
Burkinabé expatriate sportspeople in Saudi Arabia
Burkinabé expatriate sportspeople in Ivory Coast
Expatriate footballers in Cameroon
Expatriate footballers in Egypt
Expatriate footballers in Saudi Arabia
Expatriate footballers in Ivory Coast
Burkinabé Premier League players
21st-century Burkinabé people